is a Japanese former professional baseball pitcher in Japan's Nippon Professional Baseball. He played for the Tohoku Rakuten Golden Eagles in 2012 and from 2014 to 2016.

External links

NPB stats

1987 births
Living people
Baseball people from Sapporo
Japanese baseball players
Nippon Professional Baseball pitchers
Tohoku Rakuten Golden Eagles players